The 2016 Arab Clubs Champions Championship was the 34th edition of Arab world's premier club volleyball tournament held in Sousse and M'saken.

Group stage
The draw was held on 23 January 2016 in Bahrain.

Pool A

|}

|}

Pool B

|}

|}

Pool C

|}

|}

Pool D

|}

|}

Knockout stage

Quarterfinals

|}

Semifinals

|}

Bronze medal match

|}

Final

|}

Final standing

Awards

Most Valuable Player
  Amenallah Hmissi (Étoile Sportive du Sahel)
Best Setter
  Amir Kerboua (Smouha SC)
Best Outside Spikers
  Walid Abbes (CS Sfaxien)
  Mohamed Gabal (Smouha SC)

Best Middle Blockers
  Ahmed Kadhi (Étoile Sportive du Sahel)
  Mohamed Abu Rayya (Smouha SC)
Best Opposite Spiker
  Marouen Garci (Étoile Sportive du Sahel)
Best Libero
  Hamid Ali Mustafa (As-Swehly)

References

 Results and Ranking (goalzz.com)

External links
 Official Arab Volleyball Association website

Arab Clubs Championship (volleyball)
2016 Arab Volleyball Clubs Champions Championship
Arab Volleyball Clubs Champions Championship